The 20th Finswimming World Championships were held in Belgrade, Serbia at the Sports Center Milan Gale Muškatirović and at Ada Ciganlija Lake from 16 to 20 July 2018.

Medal overview

Men's events

 Swimmers who participated in the heats only and received medals.

Women's events

 Swimmers who participated in the heats only and received medals.

Mixed events

 Swimmers who participated in the heats only and received medals.

Medal table

References

External links
Official website
Results
CMAS

Finswimming World Championships
Finswimming World Championships
International sports competitions in Belgrade
Finswimming World Championships
2010s in Belgrade